Dora Maria Reis Dias de Jesus (born 20 May 1966 in Lisbon) is a retired Portuguese singer.

She represented Portugal twice at the Eurovision Song Contest. In 1986 she was 14th with Não sejas mau para mim and two years later she was 18th with Voltarei.

In February 2013 at the age of 46 she posed nude for Playboy Portugal in a photoshoot by Ana Dias.

References

Eurovision Song Contest entrants for Portugal
Eurovision Song Contest entrants of 1986
Eurovision Song Contest entrants of 1988
20th-century Portuguese women singers
Living people
1966 births